Leo Tynkkynen (6 November 1934 – 11 February 1971) was a Finnish speed skater. He competed at the 1956 Winter Olympics and the 1960 Winter Olympics.

References

External links
 

1934 births
1971 deaths
Finnish male speed skaters
Olympic speed skaters of Finland
Speed skaters at the 1956 Winter Olympics
Speed skaters at the 1960 Winter Olympics
People from Lappeenranta
Sportspeople from South Karelia